Borislav Mikelić (13 September 1939 – 12 May 2018) was a Serbian businessman and politician. He was of Croatian Serb background.

Early life
A Serb born in Bosnia and Herzegovina, Yugoslavia, numerous members of Mikelić's family, including his parents, were killed in the Second World War by the Ustashas (Croatian fascists), along with masses of other Serbs, for involvement in the Partisan resistance movement. Eight of his relatives died in the notorious concentration camp Jasenovac. After the war, Mikelić grew up in orphanages in Slovenia and Croatia.

He came to reside in the municipality of Petrinja in the Croatian region of Banovina, where he soon rose in the political structure. In the 1970s he served as mayor of Petrinja, and was an important figure there for the rest of the Socialist period. He set up the enterprise Gavrilović, a meat processing firm, which was very successful, and he was recognised throughout Yugoslavia as a prominent businessman.

In the 1980s he rose to the Central Committee of the League of Communists of Croatia (SKH), and in April 1989 was elected to the Central Committee of the League of Communists of Yugoslavia (SKJ). He was a prominent ethnic Serb in the Croatian party hierarchy.

Breakup of Yugoslavia
With the rise of nationalism and end of Communism in Yugoslavia in 1989–90, Mikelić found himself in a republic, Croatia, caught between two rival nationalisms – Croatian and Serbian. Mikelić opposed both, and, in August 1990 he and a number of other Serbs, Croats and others in the SKH formed the Yugoslavist Socialist Party of Croatia – Party of Yugoslav Orientation, to oppose the pro-Croatian Social Democratic Party of Croatia led by Ivica Račan and the pro-Serbian Serbian Democratic Party (SDS) led by Jovan Rašković. The party's secretary was a Croatian, Goran Babić, and the membership and leadership included a large number of Croats, and also Muslims, Hungarians and other nations and nationalities, though pro-Yugoslav Serbs were most numerous. The party essentially supported the status quo ante bellum, i.e. preservation of federal Yugoslavia and Croatia as a federal republic of that federation, with the Serbs as a constituent nation, opposing both demands for confederalisation and Croatian independence and autonomy for the Serbs or the redrawing of any state borders.

In late September 1990, when Croatian police were sent to investigate Serb forces being organized in Petrinja, the Serb forces attacked the Croatian police force without warning. Mikelić, whose party was the first to inform the Federal Presidency of these dramatic events, was accused of organising a Serbian rebellion by the Croatian government. Later in 1990, Mikelić had a near-fatal car accident in Bosnia. He spent several months in hospital in Belgrade.

The Socialist Party in January 1991 joined the League of Communists – Movement for Yugoslavia, but its influence in Croatia was not great. The HDZ also asked him to quit his job running Gavrilović, threatening to blockade the company if he did not resign.

Mikelić spent the next few years in Serbia, continuing his business activities. He was often asked to join the Socialist Party of Serbia of Slobodan Milošević, but never did, deciding not to attend their meetings and congresses, and instead associating with the Yugoslav Left.

Krajina Prime Minister
Mikelić returned to prominence in the political scene in 1994, when he was elected Prime Minister of the Serbian Republic of Krajina. As Prime Minister, Mikelić promoted economic, monetary and judicial ties with the Republic of Serbia (Belgrade), supported the idea of unification with Republika Srpska (the "United Serb Republic"), and was leading Krajina towards eventual unification with Serbia and Montenegro, with Belgrade's backing. This was undermined, however, in early 1995 when the Z4 Plan was presented before the economic integration had got going, and Croatia decided not to renew the UNPROFOR mandate. Milan Martić, President of RSK, and Milan Babić, RSK Foreign Minister, declared that they would not consider Z4 until the mandate was renewed. Mikelić regarded them as committing a major error in appearing to be obstinate, though he himself accepted Z4 only as a basis for negotiation, as it offered autonomy only to 11 municipalities, which formed less than half of the RSK's territory. Mikelić was dismissed in June 1995.

Milan Martić, RSK President, claimed at one government meeting in early 1995 that Milošević had called him and backed his rejection of Z4. Mikelić thought this odd, as Milošević had been encouraging his economic agreements with Croatia, which were intended to lead to gradual reintegration. At a meeting with him shortly after this, Mikelić asked Milošević if what Martić had said was true. Milošević denied it vigorously, and Mikelić believes him to have been telling the truth, given Milošević's role in encouraging reintegration in 1994.

References

1939 births
2018 deaths
People from Novi Grad, Bosnia and Herzegovina
Serbs of Bosnia and Herzegovina
Serbs of Croatia
Republic of Serbian Krajina
League of Communists – Movement for Yugoslavia politicians
League of Communists of Croatia politicians
Serbian sports executives and administrators